Gasbags is a 1941 British comedy film directed by Walter Forde and Marcel Varnel and starring The Crazy Gang as well as Moore Marriott. The film was a morale-booster in the early part of the Second World War.

Production
It was shot at the Lime Grove Studios in London. The film's sets were designed by the art director Alex Vetchinsky. It was the fourth and final film starring the comedians at Gainsborough Pictures. Flanagan and Allen subsequently moved to British National where they made a further four films over the next few years.

Plot summary
The Crazy Gang's mobile fish and chip shop is tethered to a barrage balloon which lifts the shop into the air and the gang is carried to Nazi Germany. They are captured but break out of prison, impersonate Adolf Hitler and return to England in a stolen secret weapon.

Cast
Bud Flanagan as Bud
Chesney Allen as Ches
Jimmy Nervo as Cecil
Teddy Knox as Knoxy
Charlie Naughton as Charlie
Jimmy Gold as Goldy
Moore Marriott as Jerry Jenkins
Wally Patch as Sergeant-Major
Peter Gawthorne as Commanding Officer
Frederick Valk as Sturmfuehrer
Eric Clavering as Scharffuehrer
Anthony Eustrel as Gestapo Officer
Carl Jaffe as Gestapo Chief
Manning Whiley as Colonel
Torin Thatcher as SS Man
 George Merritt as German General 
Irene Handl as Burgomaster's wife
Leonard Sharp as Chip Shop customer
 Mavis Villiers as Woman
 Henry Longhurst as Woodcutter
Theodore Zichy as 2nd in Command

Critical reception
TV Guide called it "An exhilarating comedy"; while the Radio Times called it "the best film ever made by the Crazy Gang...Director Marcel Varnel has just the right surreal touch to make it work and leave audiences laughing."

Soundtrack
Bud Flanagan and Chesney Allen - "Yesterday's Dreams" (Written by Michael Carr and Dorothy Day)

References

Bibliography
 Mayer, Geoff. Guide to British Cinema. Greenwood Publishing Group, 2003.

External links

1941 films
1940s adventure comedy films
British adventure comedy films
British World War II propaganda films
1940s English-language films
British black-and-white films
Films set in London
Films set in Germany
Films set in Salzburg
Films about Nazi Germany
Films directed by Walter Forde
Films directed by Marcel Varnel
Films with screenplays by Marriott Edgar
Gainsborough Pictures films
Films shot at Lime Grove Studios
1941 comedy films